XMG may refer to:

 Crossmaglen a British Military abbreviation for the village
 Xiamen Media Group,  television and radio broadcasting network
 XMG Studio, mobile games developer